Rogers State University (RSU) is a public university in Claremore, Oklahoma. It also has branch campuses in Bartlesville and Pryor Creek.

History

The institution that is now RSU has gone through several stages, from its foundation as a state-sponsored preparatory school to its transition to a military academy, and finally to its current incarnation as a four-year regional university.

It has its roots in the Eastern University Preparatory School, which was founded in 1909. During the construction of the famous "Preparatory Hall", Eastern University Preparatory School held its classes in the old Claremont building until 1911. The institution was closed in 1917.

In 1919 it was restarted as the Oklahoma Military Academy (OMA), to meet the growing educational and training needs of the United States armed forces. In 1923 it became a six-year program, providing a high school and junior college education. The school received an Army ROTC Honor School rating in 1932, and the junior college division became fully accredited in 1950. Graduates of the program became second lieutenants in the United States Army Reserve; more than 2,500 OMA graduates served in the military, and more than 100 alumni died serving their country during World War II, the Korean War and the Vietnam War.

OMA's enrollment declined during the later 1960s, due in part to the unpopularity of the Vietnam War, and in 1971, the Oklahoma Legislature replaced OMA with an institution to grant two-year associate degrees to the public known as Claremore Junior College. In 1982, it became Rogers State College, named after Rogers County where the main campus is located; the county in turn is named in honor of Clement Vann Rogers, not Clem's son, Will Rogers. In 1996, Rogers State College and the University Center at Tulsa (UCAT)–an extension center operated by the University of Oklahoma, Oklahoma State University, Northeastern State University and Langston University–merged to form Rogers University, with campuses in Claremore and Tulsa. The merged school operated for two years before being separated by the state Legislature. The Tulsa campus–the former University Center–became Oklahoma State University–Tulsa. The Claremore campus–the former Rogers State College–became a member of the OU Board of Regents and was renamed Rogers State University. RSU was given permission to seek accreditation as a four-year, bachelor's-degree-granting university. In 2000, RSU became the institution it is today, a public four-year, residential university.

On August 16, 2006, Rogers State's Stratton Taylor Library was named a Federal depository library, the 20th in the state of Oklahoma.

The university celebrated its centennial anniversary in 2009 with a series of special events, lectures and celebrations, culminating with the dedication of the Centennial Center building that serves as a student services center. In 2005, RSU acquired a historic nine-story building to serve as its campus in downtown Bartlesville and the facility is a major anchor in the downtown Bartlesville redevelopment. In 2014, RSU celebrated the opening of its new Pryor campus at the MidAmerica Industrial Park in Mayes County, Oklahoma. The $10 million construction project and 83-acre site were provided to the university by the Oklahoma Ordnance Works Authority, which operates the park as a public trust. The donation represents the largest gift in the university's history.

Academics

RSU currently offers bachelor's degrees in 17 disciplines and associate degrees in 13 disciplines. In conjunction with Cameron University, RSU also offers a "2+2" program in Elementary Education, in which students can earn an associate degree in elementary education from RSU and then transition to the final two years of a bachelor's degree in elementary education from Cameron, with all classes taught at RSU's campus in Claremore. Three bachelor's degrees, in Applied Technology, Business Information Technology and Liberal Arts, and four associate degrees are available completely online.

In 2013, the university was granted approval to offer its first graduate degree program, a Master of Business Administration that was to begin in fall 2014.

Athletics

The Rogers State athletic teams are called the Hillcats. The university is a member of the NCAA Division II ranks, primarily competing in the Mid-America Intercollegiate Athletics Association (MIAA) for most of its sports as an associate member since the 2019–20 academic year (before achieving full member status in 2022–23); while its men's soccer team competes in the Great American Conference (GAC). The Hillcats previously competed in the D-II Heartland Conference from 2013–14 to 2018–19; and in the Sooner Athletic Conference (SAC) of the National Association of Intercollegiate Athletics (NAIA) from 2007–08 to 2012–13.

Rogers State competes in 14 intercollegiate varsity sports: Men's sports include baseball, basketball, cross country, golf, soccer and track & field (indoor and outdoor); women's sports include basketball, cross country, golf, soccer, softball and track & field (indoor and outdoor).

Mascot
Their mascot, a fictional animal based on a bobcat and named for the hill that the school sits upon, was chosen in 2005 by a group of students.

Athletic director
Wren Baker, current Vice President and Director of Athletics for North Texas Mean Green, served as the first Director of Athletics at RSU. After his departure to Northwest Missouri State for a similar position Baker was replaced by Ryan Bradley, previously the Associate Athletic Director for External Relations. Bradley departed for the University of Memphis to work for Baker then Deputy Athletic Director for the Tigers.

In 2013, Ryan Erwin joined Rogers State as the Director of Athletics from Dallas Baptist University. On August 1, 2016, Erwin announced his resignation to accept the Vice President and Director of Athletics position at East Texas Baptist University (NCAA D-III). On November 18, 2016, President Dr. Larry Rice announced that Chris Ratcliff, Director of Athletics at the University of Arkansas - Monticello, would assume the role of Director of Athletics.

Accomplishments
 The Hillcats' women's softball team became the first RSU athletic team to be nationally ranked on March 28, 2007, entering the NAIA softball ratings at No. 22.
 The men's basketball team earned the school's first number one ranking on January 26, 2009.
 On May 31, 2022, the Hillcats' women's softball team won the NCAA Div II National Championship in Denver, Colorado.

Media

RSU's radio station, KRSC, is broadcast on 91.3 FM and over the Internet. It began in 1980 as a 10-watt station, and is now 3000 watts, reaching an audience of more than 1.2 million in northeastern Oklahoma. The station's programming consists mainly of indie rock and pop, with specialty rock, blues, punk and Native American music shows. KRSC also provides coverage of Hillcat basketball, baseball and softball. The station is staffed by students, faculty and area media personalities. KRSC broadcasts 24 hours a day, seven days a week. The facilities are in Markham Hall.

RSU's television station, KRSU-TV 35, is the only full-powered public station licensed to a public university in the state. It broadcasts cultural and educational programming on UHF Channel 35 and digital channel 36 from its 2.75-million-watt tower 24 hours a day. The station is also carried on local cable systems and is available on Cox Cable Channel 19 in Claremore and Tulsa. The station is home to many telecourses and interactive courses, part of RSU's distance-learning programs. It also produces in-house documentaries and regular programming. It is operated by a paid staff, with assistance from RSU students. The station reaches an audience of 1.2 million in the northeastern Oklahoma and southeastern Kansas areas.

The independent student newspaper The Hillpost was originally established as a print newspaper in 2009 and re-established as an online news publication in 2020. It was produced in collaboration with the Claremore Daily Progress which allowed the student editors to print their newspaper for distribution on all three of Rogers State University's campuses and allowed for the newspaper to be inserted within regular issues of the Claremore Daily Progress.

Greek life
Rogers State University is home to two sororities, Alpha Sigma Tau, Epsilon Delta chapter, initiated in November 2005, and Alpha Sigma Alpha, Theta Eta chapter.

Controversy
In 2003, then Rogers State University President Joe Wiley was sued by a former university employee. Former university controller Ryan Parris alleged he was terminated for not approving travel claims. In the lawsuit, Parris claimed he was pressured to approve non-business travel as university expenses and refused to do so. Parris alleged that both Wiley and the university's vice president for business affairs attempted to coerce him. Parris later claimed that falsified documents were submitted.

In 2004, a student club at Rogers State University encountered issues in organizing on campus. According to the Foundation for Individual Rights in Education, the Organization for Advocating the Rights of Students experienced "administrative restrictions" while attempting to organize and promote itself on campus. Former RSU student and club member Renee Morse-Heenan established the club after observing what she called a “culture of fear” at the institution.
The student club was later officially recognized by the university and an administrator left from their position.

Previously, Rogers State University operated an equine-assisted therapy program on its campus. In 2004, the university stated its intentions to begin a $2 million capital campaign to support the program. That year, a local resident, Wanda Sanders, donated 20 acres to support the program and later gave an additional 40 acres four years later. In a lawsuit filed in 2017, Sanders alleged that the land donations were not used to their donated intent and that university transferred the land to another organization in 2013. The land was then sold, again, to the university's foundation, a separate, tax-exempt organization. The university later attempted to mediate the lawsuit in 2017.

References

External links

 
 Rogers State athletics website

 
Public universities and colleges in Oklahoma
Bartlesville, Oklahoma
Education in Rogers County, Oklahoma
Educational institutions established in 1909
OK Cooperative Alliance
Buildings and structures in Rogers County, Oklahoma
Education in Mayes County, Oklahoma
Education in Washington County, Oklahoma
1909 establishments in Oklahoma